Boronia alulata is a plant in the citrus family, Rutaceae and is endemic to Cape York Peninsula. It is an erect shrub with many branches, pinnate leaves and pink or white, four-petalled flowers.

Description
The leaves are pinnate with between five and seventeen elliptic leaflets that are densely hairy on the lower side. The flowers are pink or white and are arranged in leaf axils in groups of up to seven. The eight stamens alternate in length, the shorter ones opposite the petals.

Taxonomy and naming
Boronia alulata was first formally described in 1863 by George Bentham from an unpublished description by Daniel Solander. The description was published in Flora Australiensis from a specimen collected from near the Endeavour River. The specific epithet (alulata) is the diminutive form of the Latin word alatus meaning "winged", hence "with narrow wings".

Distribution and habitat
This boronia grows in woodland and heath on Cape York Peninsula as far south as near Cooktown.

Conservation
Boronia alulata is classified as "least concern" under the Queensland Government Nature Conservation Act 1992.

References

alulata
Flora of Queensland
Plants described in 1863
Taxa named by George Bentham